John Peter Halsmer (born March 3, 1944, in Lafayette, Indiana), is a former driver in the CART Championship Car series. He raced in 5 seasons (1980, 1982–1985), with 33 career starts, and started in the Indianapolis 500 in 1981–1982. He finished in the top five three times in the CART series, with his best finish in 2nd position in 1983 at Cleveland. In 1992, Halsmer raced in the IROC series, representing IMSA. Pete drove for Ford/Roush (NASCAR owner Jack Roush) from 1986 through 1989 and won six Trans Am races and four GTO races winning the 1989 GTO championship. From 1990 through 1992 he drove for Mazda and won another GTO championship in 1991. From 1994 through 1997 he drove BMWs, winning four GT2 races and winning the Manufacturer's Title in 1996. From 1999 to 2004 he drove for and provided technical consulting for Honda America Race Team winning several championships in Motorola Cup and Grand Am Cup series.  Halsmer is also a 3 time class winner at the 24 Hours of Daytona and was trained as a helicopter pilot and served in the Vietnam War.

Early life and education
Halsmer graduated from Purdue University with degrees in industrial supervision and aviation electronics. He was drafted into the army and  became a helicopter pilot. He served in Vietnam during the Vietnam War in 1970.

Racing record

CART PPG IndyCar World Series

(key) (Races in bold indicate pole position)

Indianapolis 500

SCCA National Championship Runoffs

(key) (Races in bold indicate pole position, races in italics indicate fastest race lap)

Complete USAC Mini-Indy Series results

References

1944 births
Living people
United States Army personnel of the Vietnam War
American Le Mans Series drivers
Champ Car drivers
Indianapolis 500 drivers
International Race of Champions drivers
Sportspeople from Lafayette, Indiana
Racing drivers from Indiana
Trans-Am Series drivers
SCCA Formula Super Vee drivers
World Sportscar Championship drivers
Purdue University alumni
SCCA National Championship Runoffs participants
24 Hours of Daytona drivers
United States Army soldiers